Bryant Park is an 8.7 acre urban park at 1701 West Morehead Street in the Historic Camp Greene neighborhood of Charlotte, North Carolina. It contains a softball field and a multi-purpose public field. In 2003 the Charlotte-Mecklenburg Historic Landmarks Commission designated Bryant Park as a historic landmark.

The park was constructed in the 1930s as WPA project and is noted for its unique network of stone walls and stone seating above the softball fields. Built on land donated by prominent Charlotte developer E. C. Griffith, it was one of the first projects of the Charlotte Park and Recreation Commission.

In the 1960s and 1970s, when the Charlotte Parks Commission was underfunded and mostly powerless, intense industrial development on West Morehead Street forced Bryant Park to give up much of its original space. Today the park is less than half its original size. Bryant Park remains the only public green space in Charlotte's West Morehead Street industrial sector.

References

External links
 Map of Bryant Park
 Charlotte-Mecklenburg Historic Landmarks Commission: Defining the Park for the Public (Essay)

Parks in Charlotte, North Carolina